Yakuza 0 is an action-adventure game developed by Ryu Ga Gotoku Studio and published by Sega. It is the sixth main entry in the Yakuza series and a prequel to the original game. It was released for PlayStation 3 and PlayStation 4 in Japan in March 2015, and in North America and Europe for PlayStation 4 in January 2017. It was released on Windows on 1 August 2018 and on Xbox One on 26 February 2020. A free accompanying game application for PlayStation Vita, titled Yakuza 0: Free to Play Application for PlayStation Vita, was released in Japan in February 2015. Set in late 1988 during Japan's bubble era, and seventeen years before the events of the first game, the story follows Kazuma Kiryu and Goro Majima as they get embroiled in a conflict between various Yakuza factions for control of a patch of land known as the "Empty Lot".  

The game received generally favourable reviews from critics, and is largely responsible for the franchise's rise in popularity and sales in the West, the series being deemed obscure beforehand. Yakuza 0 was followed up by a remake of the original game, Yakuza Kiwami, the next chronological installment of the series.

Gameplay 
Yakuza 0  is an action-adventure game set in an open world environment and played from a third-person perspective. The game takes place from December 1988 to January 1989, in Kamurochō and Sotenbori, fictionalized recreations of Tokyo's Kabukichō and Osaka's Dōtonbori areas respectively. The player controls series protagonist Kazuma Kiryu and recurring character Goro Majima, alternating between the two at predetermined points during the story.

Players can freely walk around Kamurocho and Sotenbori, interacting with people they meet to trigger side-quests, battling enemies who attack them on the street, or playing several minigames, including fully playable versions of Sega arcade games such as Out Run, Super Hang-On, Space Harrier and Fantasy Zone. Completing certain objectives, such as eating every dish at a restaurant or reaching a target score in a minigame, will also grant the player special Completion Point currency; these Completion Points can be spent at a shrine to receive additional bonuses, such as special items or character upgrades.

Character customization and growth is similar to the system from Ryu ga Gotoku Ishin!, with abilities bought off of a skill tree that is gradually unlocked during the game. Instead of using experience points to buy skills, the player uses money acquired from fights or via Kiryu and Majima's side businesses. Money is more liberally awarded in Yakuza 0 than in previous entries, with every heavy attack causing enemies to drop cash. The player can lose their money if they encounter a special enemy called Mr. Shakedown, huge men who are far stronger than normal. If the player is beaten, they will lose all their cash, but can beat the enemy again to earn back their money and extra.

Kiryu and Majima also have side businesses that they run during the game to earn money: Kiryu invests in real estate in Kamurocho, while Majima runs a cabaret club in Sotenbori. Completing side-quests will often result in characters they meet offering to help with side businesses, allowing players to more easily and quickly progress. Progressing in side business sequences or training with specific masters will unlock additional abilities for purchase on the characters' skill trees.

A major innovation of Yakuza 0 is the addition of multiple fighting styles for both Kiryu and Majima that can be switched in the middle of battle. Kiryu utilizes the balanced Brawler style, similar to that of previous entries; the powerful but slow Beast style, which allows him to use heavy weapons; and the fast boxing-based Rush style, which emphasizes mobility. Conversely, Majima uses the balanced Thug style; the weapons-oriented Slugger style, primarily focused around a baseball bat; and the capoeira-based Breaker style. Completing Kiryu and Majima's side businesses will unlock an additional "Legendary" fighting style for the characters, the "Dragon of Dojima" and "Mad Dog of Shimano" styles, respectively.

Plot 
In December 1988, yakuza Kazuma Kiryu is framed for murder in an empty lot in Kamurochō, Tokyo. As the Empty Lot is the last piece of land needing to be purchased before the Tojo Clan can redevelop the area, it has become the target of Dojima Family patriarch Sohei Dojima, believing obtaining it will grant him enough power and influence to become Tojo Clan chairman. To protect his adoptive father, Shintaro Kazama, from punishment, Kiryu leaves the Dojima Family.

Kiryu meets real estate agent Tetsu Tachibana, who promises to clear his name in exchange for helping him acquire the Empty Lot before Dojima. After Kiryu and Jun Oda, Tachibana's right-hand man, interfere with squatters related to the Dojima family, Dojima lieutenants Daisaku Kuze, Hiroki Awano and Keiji Shibusawa demand Kiryu turn over Tachibana. Kiryu refuses, prompting the Dojima family to hunt him down. His oath brother Akira Nishikiyama cuts ties with Kiryu to keep each other safe. Tachibana tells Kiryu that the Empty Lot's owner is his estranged sister, Makoto Makimura, who inherited it from their grandfather and lives in Sotenbori, Osaka.

In Sotenbori, ex-yakuza Goro Majima is forced to run a cabaret club, as punishment for his involvement in the Ueno-Seiwa assassination in 1985. Per the orders of his former patriarch Futoshi Shimano, Majima is under constant surveillance by Shimano's oath brother, Tsukasa Sagawa, a member of the Omi Alliance, the Tojo Clan's rivals. Following a new order from Shimano, Sagawa offers Majima a chance to rejoin the Shimano Family by assassinating Makoto, who suffers from psychogenic blindness. 

Majima finds Makoto under the protection of Wen Hai Lee, a former assassin. After Majima decides to protect Makoto, Lee suggests murdering a look-alike of Makoto to fool Sagawa. Though Majima rejects the idea, Shibusawa's assistant Homare Nishitani commits the deed in his place, hoping to attract Majima's attention. Suspecting the fraud, Sagawa sends his men to kill Majima and Makoto. Sagawa sets up a trap to kill Lee, then attempts to kill Majima and Makoto, but is stopped by Masaru Sera, an ally of Kazama, who takes Makoto away. Following a lengthy investigation, Majima and Sagawa confront Sera at his headquarters and find that he turned Makoto over to Kiryu.

Kiryu and Oda escort Makoto to Kamurocho but are chased by Shibusawa's men. Oda, revealed to be a mole for Shibusawa, attempts to kill Kiryu and Makoto. Kiryu subdues him, and Oda explains that he and Tachibana were former Chinese gangsters in Japan. At that time, Makoto migrated to Japan to find her brother, but ran afoul of Oda, who sold her to a Korean gang, where she was sexually abused. Oda discovered Makoto's identity after Tachibana saw her on a documentary, and feared his reprisal ever since. Regretting his crimes, he allows Kiryu and Makoto to flee, before being executed by Shibusawa.

Kiryu meets Tachibana, who reveals that he knew that Makoto was looking for him. He also reveals that upon learning her inheritance of the Empty Lot, he turned to Kazama, who helped him form his company to protect Makoto from Dojima, who also planned to annihilate the Kazama Family. With their interests coinciding, Kiryu and Tachibana flee but Tachibana is captured by Dojima's assassin, Lao Gui, the true perpetrator of the Empty Lot murder. Tachibana is tortured to death by Kuze and his men, whom Kiryu and Nishikiyama defeat. Makoto discovers her brother's body and regains partial sight.

Meanwhile, Majima learns that Shimano sent the kill order so that Majima would be pressured to have Makoto willingly hand over the Empty Lot to Shimano. Majima finds Makoto in the Empty Lot, plotting revenge for Tachibana's death. Despite Majima's concerns, Makoto meets Dojima, offering the Empty Lot in exchange for the deaths of his lieutenants. Dojima declines and has her shot. Sera arrives and escorts Makoto to a hospital. However, Shibusawa finds Makoto and holds her captive on a ship. Kiryu and his family storm the ship and save Makoto, whilst Majima battles the Dojima family in the Tojo HQ, including Awano who dies at Lao Gui's hands. Nishikiyama prevents Kiryu from killing Shibusawa, and both him and Kuze are handed over to the police. Majima defeats Lao Gui and prepares to kill Dojima, but is stopped by Sera, who has ultimately acquired the deeds to the Empty Lot. He orders Majima to kill Shimano for his treachery, but upon confronting Shimano, Majima relents, wanting to learn the fate of his oath brother Taiga Saejima. Shimano terminates his dealings with the Omi Alliance and reinstates Majima into his family. 

In January 1989, Sera becomes the Tojo Clan Captain, with Dojima languishing after the loss of his lieutenants. The Empty Lot is destroyed and the Millennium Tower is built on its stead. Kiryu rejoins the Dojima Family under a new oath, hoping to find his own path as a yakuza. Meanwhile, Majima adopts a new persona, inspired by Lee, Nishitani and Sagawa, to empower himself, and bids Sagawa farewell, who is later assassinated by the Omi Alliance for his failure to secure a deal with Shimano. Majima allows Makoto to live a peaceful life with her new boyfriend, and later encounters Kiryu for the first time in Kamurocho.

Development 

The game was first announced in a special Yakuza event on 24 August 2014, together with a trailer. Thirty most popular AV idols, as voted by fans in an earlier poll, were also announced to make cameo appearances in the game, with the top 10 having more significant roles (the top five would appear as the highest tier hostesses in the cabaret club minigame). A Chinese-language localization of the game was announced in 2014 and eventually released in Asia in May 2015. Shonan no Kaze performed the game's main theme and ending theme,  and  respectively; these songs were not licensed for the English release and were instead replaced by original instrumental tracks.

Sega wanted to make Majima stand out from Kiryu, as the two share the role of protagonists. Sega described Kiryu as a "straight man trait – tough but honorable and keeps to himself a bit" implying little difficulty in writing him. Through this game and the remake of the first game, Kiwami, the relationship between Kiryu and Majima is explored further than in the first game of the franchise, most notably because of changes to Majima's characterization and his views on Kiryu's actions, with the two being friends and enemies simultaneously. Yakuza 0 also showed a part of Kiryu's story that Sega wanted players to know before Yakuza 6. Kiryu's traits in Yakuza 0 were specifically changed to a "loose-cannon hot-head" to the point long time fans would be surprised by his actions. However, chief Masayoshi Yokoyama stated the character would mature across the storyline. The goal of the localization team was to make Majima and Kiryu more likeable, although Strichart believed Kiryu was more popular than Majima in Western countries. Despite Kiryu's fame, Sato noted that players ended up enjoying Majima far more in the franchise. 

The Chinese localization of the game replaces late-game character Lao Gui, a Chinese assassin hired by the Dojima Family, with the face model and voice of Hong Kong actor Sam Lee.

On 5 December 2015, at PlayStation Experience in San Francisco, Sony Computer Entertainment's Gio Corsi announced that Yakuza 0 would be coming to the Americas for the PlayStation 4. Initially, no official confirmation was made of a European release. In July 2016, it was announced that the game would release in North America and Europe for the PlayStation 4 in January 2017.

Western localization of the game was led by Scott Strichart, associate producer of Atlus USA, who has localized Yakuza Kiwami, Yakuza Kiwami 2, and Yakuza 6. The team took a year and a half to localize Yakuza 0, which has 1.8 million Japanese characters, nearly twice as many as the average JRPG, which has 1 to 1.2 million Japanese characters. In addition to challenges translating tone and humor, Strichart's team at Atlus had difficulties localizing traditional Asian games, including Mahjong and Shogi. In order to make these minigames accessible to Western audiences, Atlus had to provide detailed rules alongside gameplay. During the localization process, Strichart said the team wrote a total of "34 pages of Mahjong explanation."

Reception

Critical response

Yakuza 0 received "generally favorable" reviews from critics, with the Xbox One version receiving "universal acclaim", according to review aggregator Metacritic.

PlayStation LifeStyle's review of the import version was a 9/10, calling it the best in the series and "the result of 10 years spent not just perfecting a formula, but adding to it." The game received a 36/40 from Famitsu on both platforms. Eurogamer ranked the game 45th on their list of the "Top 50 Games of 2017", while Polygon ranked it 44th on their list of the 50 best games of 2017, and The Verge named it as one of their 15 Best Video Games of 2017.

The game's fighting system has often been praised for its brutality, though IGN felt it might come across as too simple due to players' tendencies to smash buttons. GameInformer compared the random battles with arcade beat em up games and praised the usage of its grinding system as its usage is needed due to how challenging every character is across later chapters. GameSpot was critical to the gameplay, calling it dated as he remarked that, despite gameplay improvements from the PlayStation 3 games, there is still occasional poor performance. Nevertheless, the reviewer enjoyed the fighting system and the grinding aspects, finding them more entertaining. PlayStation Life Style praised the encounters with minor characters as well as the heat function for the cinematic movements Kiryu and Majima perform although he felt they were barely stronger than normal moves. The cabaret club minigame was particularly praised as "addictive" and "the best part" of the game. 

Reviewers also commented on the story and cast, most notably due to its accessibility as a prequel. Majima's different characterization had some writers find him more interesting than Kiryu. EGMNOW liked the contrast the duo had in the narrative. The Jimquisition called both characters "like-able protagonists who consistently have to act as straight men in a variety of weird situations". GamesRadar praised the constant switch between protagonists, as it "helps to refresh the narrative". Polygon had mixed feelings in regards to the cast as the antagonist often end up becoming trustworthy regardless of violent acts as well as the fact that most female characters are poorly treated both in the main narrative and minigames. GameSpot felt the story was the greatest strength of the game, due to its handling of cutscenes, serious storytelling and appealing voice acting. Despite finding that the game carried many common scenarios from the previous games, PlayStation LifeStyle said that Yakuza 0 has the best narrative in the entire series, praising elements such as the fast pace and the 1980's portrayal.

Sales 
The game debuted at number 1 on the Japan software chart in its first week of release. The PlayStation 3 and the PlayStation 4 version sold 146,000 units and 90,000 sales respectively. As of June 2015, the game has sold over 500,000 copies within Japan and Chinese-speaking regions of Asia. Sega president Haruki Satomi stated that the Chinese version of the game sold more than originally expected.

In the UK, Yakuza 0 was the 8th top selling game in the week of 28 January. Stock for the game was running low, which indicated the game sold far beyond expectations.

Accolades 
The Japanese version of Yakuza 0 won a Japan Game Awards Award for Excellence in the Future Division (for pre-release games showcased at the Tokyo Game Show) in 2014. The game was nominated for "Best PS4 Game" in Destructoids Game of the Year Awards 2017, and for "Best Action-Adventure Game" in IGN's Best of 2017 Awards; it also became a runner-up for "Best Style" in Giant Bomb's 2017 Game of the Year Awards. The game won the award for "Best Main Character" (Goro Majima) in Game Informers 2017 game of the Year Awards.

Notes

References

External links

2015 video games
Action-adventure games
Discrimination in fiction
Financial thrillers
Open-world video games
Organized crime video games
PlayStation 3 games
PlayStation 4 games
Sega beat 'em ups
Single-player video games
Video game prequels
Video games about slavery
Video games developed in Japan
Video games scored by Hidenori Shoji
Video games set in 1988
Video games set in 1989
Video games set in Osaka
Video games set in Tokyo
Windows games
Xbox Cloud Gaming games
Xbox One games
Yakuza (franchise)
Video game memes
Internet memes introduced in 2020